Kemin Industries supplies specialty ingredients for several industries, including human/animal health and nutrition, pet food, aquaculture, nutraceutical, food technologies, crop technologies, and textile industries.

Established in 1961, Kemin Industries is a privately held, family-owned-and-operated company with more than 2,800 global employees. It operates in 90 countries, and has manufacturing facilities in Belgium, Brazil, China, India, Italy, Russia, San Marino, Singapore, South Africa and the United States.

Industries served 
 Animal nutrition and health 
Pet food and rendering technologies 
Food technologies 
Human nutrition and health 
Crop technologies 
Textile auxiliaries 
Aquaculture 
Biofuels 
Biologics

Company history
Kemin Industries was founded in Des Moines, Iowa, U.S.A. by RW Nelson and Mary Nelson. When the Nelsons started their business, they had five children under the age of seven and USD$10,000 in a savings account. The company operated with two product lines, a manufacturing plant in an old wool barn, and Mary keeping the books at the family home.  

During the 1980s, led by Christopher E. Nelson, Ph.D., RW and Mary Nelson’s oldest son and the current President and CEO of Kemin, scientists were challenged to study molecules and understand their modes of action inside living organisms. This new approach to research and development spurred the company’s expansion into new markets. Kemin’s ingredients expanded into animal health, nutraceuticals, pet food, food technologies, crop technologies, textiles, aquaculture and animal vaccines.  

In 1995, Kemin innovated lutein, a carotenoid molecule the company had been selling into the animal feed industry for years, for human use. This led to the establishment of Kemin’s first business unit, Human Nutrition and Health. Kemin adopted the business unit-focused model for other expansion beyond animal nutrition and health into pet food and rendering technologies, food technologies, human nutrition and health and crop technologies and more.

Kemin global expansion highlights include: 

 1970 – Opened first regional headquarters in Herentals, Belgium. The sales and manufacturing facility allowed Kemin to efficiently work with customers across Europe. 
 1988 – Established second regional headquarters with sales and manufacturing facilities in Singapore. 
 1994 – Established sales office site in Zhuhai, China. 
 1998 – Opened sales and manufacturing facilities in Chennai, India.  
 2000 – Moved the Chennai manufacturing facilities to Gummidipundi, India. 
 2002 – Established a manufacturing site in Zhuhai, China. 
 2004 – Purchased sales and manufacturing facility in Indaiatuba, Brazil. Opened sales and manufacturing facility in Johannesburg, South Africa. 
 2009 – Opened second European manufacturing site in Veronella, Italy. 
 2010 – Purchased encapsulation company and facility in Cavriago, Italy. 
 2014 – Created new regional headquarters in Johannesburg, South Africa. 
 2017 – Opened state-of-the-art sales and manufacturing facility in Lipetsk, Russia.   Acquired a beta-glucan manufacturing facility in Plymouth, Michigan, U.S.A. 
 2018 – Acquired Garmon Chemicals to launch Kemin’s textile auxiliaries business unit in the Republic of San Marino.   Launched the new business unit Kemin AquaScience to serve the aquaculture industry. 

Kemin remains headquartered in Des Moines, Iowa, U.S.A. with sales, research and manufacturing facilities. 

In 2017, Kemin opened a USD$30 million worldwide headquarters building where the wool barn in which the company manufactured its first products once sat.

References

Companies based in Iowa